Bidzina Kvernadze, (29 July 1928, Sighnaghi, Georgia, – 8 July 2010, Tbilisi), was a famous Georgian composer.

Bidzina was born in Sighnaghi, the Kakheti region of former Soviet Georgia to Alexander Kvernadze, a pharmacist, and Nino Nadirashvili, a music teacher.

In 1948, Bidzina presented his musical works to Examination Commission, and he was accepted to the Tbilisi State Conservatoire with the highest score. He finished the composition class in 1958, taught by Andria Balanchivadze. In the same year he was accepted as a member of the Union of Soviet Composers.

Among his honors are  the title of "People's Artist of the USSR" (1979), the "Z. Paliashvili Prize" (1981, for My Entreaty, Old Georgian Inscriptions and Vocal-Symphonic Poem) and the "Shota Rustaveli State Prize" (1985, Opera "And it was in the eighth year"). He was also named an Honorary Citizen of Tbilisi (1995).

Filmography
 2001 Antimoz iverieli 
 1996 Qva (Short) 
 1995 Tsarsulis achrdilebi 
 1991 Premiera (TV Movie) 
 1990 Omi kvelastvis omia 
 1990 White Banners 
 1985 Ert patara qalaqshi 
 1985 Christmas tree of Neilon
 1983 Andredzi (Short) 
 1983 Tsigni pitsisa (TV Movie) 
 1981 Me davbrundebi 
 1979 Salamuras tavgadasavlebi (Short) 
 1977 Data Tutashkhia (TV Series) 
 1977 The Wishing Tree
 1977 Sikvaruli, khandzari da pompiero 
 1975 Chiriki da Chikotela 
 1967 Qalaqi adre igvidzebs 
 1966 Shekhvedra mtashi 
 1961 Chiakokona 
 1961 Mgeris Borjomis nadzvi (TV Short) 
 1961 Udiplomo sasidzo 
 1960 Levana (Short) 
 1959 Ganacheni

Works

Orchestral
 To the Dawn (symphonic poem), 1953
 Concerto No. 1, piano, orchestra, 1955
 Concerto, violin, orchestra, 1956
 A Fancy Dance, 1959
 Symphony No. 1, 1961
 Seraphita, 1964 (section of Choreographic Stories; may be performed separately as a concert work)
 Concerto No. 2, piano, orchestra, 1966
 Expectation, string orchestra, 1968
 Ceremonial Overture, 1977
 Symphonic Overture, 1984
 Symphony No. 2, string orchestra, 1986

Choral
 Immortality (cantata, texts by L. Chubabria, Petre Gruzinsky), speaker, mixed chorus, orchestra, 1971
 Cantata about Georgia (text by Petre Gruzinsky), baritone, mixed chorus, orchestra, 1971
 My Entreaty (vocal–symphonic poem, text by Nikoloz Baratashvili), mixed chorus, orchestra, 1974, revised 1977

Vocal
 Old Georgian Inscriptions (text by Giorgi Leonidze), tenor, orchestra, 1978
 Vocal–Symphonic Poem (texts by Eter Tataraidze, folk poems from Georgia), mezzo-soprano, orchestra, 1979
 Pray, Child (triptych, text by Iakob Gogebashvili), soprano, piano, 2001, revised 2002

Stage
 Choreographic Stories (ballet in 2 acts, scenario by Zurab Kikaleishvili, Guram Meliva, Chukurtma Gudiashvili, after Lado Gudiashvili), 1964 (one section may be performed separately as a concert work: Seraphita)
 Wives and Husbands (operetta in 2 acts, libretto by R. Lezgishvili), 1970
 Berikaoba (ballet in 1 act, scenario by Giorgi Alexidze), 1973
 And it was in the eighth year (opera in 2 acts, libretto by Robert Sturua, after Jacob of Tsurtavi), 1982
 Happier than we (opera in 2 acts, libretto by Robert Sturua, after Ilia Chavchavadze), 1987

Awards
 1998 - Orden of honour
 1996 - Honorary citizen of Tbilisi 
 1985 - Shota Rustaveli State Prize
 1981 - Zakaria Paliashvili Prize
 People's Artist of Georgia

References

External links

Bidzina Kvernadze at the Georgian Music Information Center

1928 births
2010 deaths
20th-century classical composers
20th-century male musicians
Burials at Didube Pantheon
Classical composers from Georgia (country)
Classical musicians from Georgia (country)
People from Kakheti
Rustaveli Prize winners
Soviet classical composers
Soviet male classical composers